A wardrobe malfunction is a clothing failure that accidentally or intentionally exposes a person's intimate parts. It is different from deliberate incidents of indecent exposure or public flashing. Justin Timberlake first used the term when apologizing for the Super Bowl XXXVIII halftime show controversy during the 2004 Grammy Awards. The phrase "wardrobe malfunction" was in turn used by the media to refer to the incident and entered pop culture. There was a long history of such incidents before the term was coined and it has since become common.

Etymology
The American Dialect Society defines "wardrobe malfunction" as "an unanticipated exposure of bodily parts". Global Language Monitor, which tracks usage of words on the internet and in newspapers worldwide, identified the term as the top Hollywood, California, United States contribution to English (HollyWordie) in 2004, surpassing words like girlie men, Yo! and frass. The term was also one of the new entrants into the Chambers Dictionary in 2008, along with words like electrosmog, carbon footprint, credit crunch and social networking. The dictionary defines it as "the temporary failure of an item of clothing to do its job in covering a part of the body that it would be advisable to keep covered."

Origins
The term was first used on February 1, 2004, by singers Justin Timberlake and Janet Jackson in a statement attempting to explain the Super Bowl XXXVIII halftime show controversy, during which Jackson's right breast was exposed. Timberlake apologized for the incident, stating he was "sorry that anyone was offended by the wardrobe malfunction during the halftime performance of the Super Bowl..." The term wardrobe malfunction appeared in numerous stories in major US consumer and business publications, newspapers, and major TV and radio broadcasts. Journalist Eric Alterman described the incident as "the most famous 'wardrobe malfunction' since Lady Godiva."

Related terms
The American Dialect Society had a number of related terms for word of the year nominations in 2004, including Janet moment ("unplanned bodily exposure at a public function"), boobgate ("scandal over Janet Jackson's exposed breast"), nipplegate (like boobgate, "but used earlier in squawk over Jackson's possible nipple ring"), and wardrobe malfunction ("overexposure in a mammary way").

Instances

In April 1957, Italian actress Sophia Loren was being welcomed to Hollywood by Paramount Pictures at a dinner party at Romanoff's restaurant in Beverly Hills. American actress Jayne Mansfield arrived last and went directly to Loren's table. Mansfield had previously engineered several stunts exposing her breasts. On this evening, she was seated between Loren and her dinner companion Clifton Webb. Braless and wearing a deeply plunging neckline, Mansfield at one point stood and purposefully leaned over the table, further exposing her breasts and her left nipple. Photographer Delmar Watson pictured Loren staring at Mansfield's breasts, and Joe Shere also recorded the incident. Shere's picture received international attention, and was published world-wide.

On February 1, 2004, the halftime show of Super Bowl XXXVIII was broadcast live from Houston, Texas, on the CBS television network in the United States. During the show, Justin Timberlake deliberately removed a portion of Janet Jackson's costume, exposing for about half a second her breast adorned with a nipple shield. This was the first recorded usage of the term "wardrobe malfunction". The incident, sometimes referred to as Nipplegate, was news worldwide. MTV's chief executive said that Jackson had planned the stunt and Timberlake was informed of it just moments before he took the stage. The stunt was broadcast live to a total audience of 143.6 million viewers.

At the 2016 NFL Draft Combine, American football player Chris Jones ripped his compression shorts in the crotch during the 40-yard dash, and his genitals were seen live on television.

See also

 Dress code
 Exhibitionism
 Voyeurism
 Whale tail

Notes

References

Clothing controversies
English phrases
Nudity
2004 neologisms
Euphemisms